"The Platinum Rule" is the 11th episode in the third season of the television series How I Met Your Mother and 55th overall. It originally aired on December 10, 2007.

It was the last episode to air before the 2007–08 Writers Guild of America strike.

Plot 
Ted announces to the group that he is planning on taking out his tattoo removal doctor Stella to a movie and is immediately met with disapproval. Barney mentions the Golden Rule: Although it is known commonly from the Bible as the ethic of reciprocity ("Do unto to others as you would have them do unto you."), Barney's take on it is "Love thy neighbor", which would lead into his Platinum Rule as "Never ever, ever, ever love thy neighbor." His point is that one should never date someone seen on a regular basis, e.g. someone at the same workplace, a next-door neighbor, etc. because such relationships never work out in the end and lead to never-ending suffering, as those involved would see each other constantly. Barney begins to outline the Platinum Rule in eight steps as the group begins to recount on their past experiences against the Platinum Rule in attempt to persuade Ted not to go on his date. He uses examples of Marshall and Lily getting too close to a neighboring couple, Robin dating a fellow news anchor and himself having casual sex with Wendy the Waitress at MacLaren's Pub.

The Platinum Rule 
The eight steps of the process and the group’s examples: 
 Attraction (Marshall and Lily meet their neighboring couple, Michael and Laura, who, like them, loves eating brunch; Curt, an ex hockey player, introduces himself to Robin; Barney realizes how easy it would be to sleep with Wendy)
 Bargaining (Marshall and Lily plan on inviting Michael and Laura for dinner; Robin realizes she has a crush on Curt; Barney decides to seduce Wendy and announces it to the group, who think he will ruin the bar if he decides to sleep with her)
 Submission (Marshall and Lily invite Michael and Laura to dinner; Curt invites Robin to a hockey game; Barney finally sleeps with Wendy)
 Perks (Marshall and Lily explain that it is convenient to have friends who live across the hall (they can go on double dates and have game nights together); Robin tells the group she and Curt could split a cab, they have the same lunch and how Curt got Robin to meet Vancouver Canucks player Mason Raymond; Barney realizes he could get free food)
 The Tipping Point (Marshall and Lily notice that Michael and Laura always show up when they plan to do things on their own; Robin realizes how clingy Curt actually is; Barney gets upset that he cannot hit on women at MacLaren's anymore)
 Purgatory (Marshall and Lily finally vent about Michael and Laura and how they always appear when not wanted; Robin complains about how Curt is always leaving love notes everywhere; Barney blames the group for him dating Wendy and tells them about his dismay over sleeping with same women)
 Confrontation (Marshall and Lily tell Michael and Laura that they are tired of playing charades with them; Robin finally breaks up with Curt; Barney bluntly tells Wendy that he wants to sleep with other women)
 Fallout (Marshall and Lily run into Michael and Laura while trying to sneak out; Robin is doing a news segment with Curt, who makes a euphemism about how Robin did not deserve his love; Barney believes that Wendy is trying to poison him)

Even after all three experiences are fully recounted, Ted still decides to go on his date. When he gets back, he tells the group that Stella did not consider it a date and that it is actually against AMA rules for her to date patients. Future Ted reflects on the "Platinum Rule" and suggests there is a ninth step: Co-Existence, as we see the other members of the gang begin to do so with those they dated (except for Barney who still believes that Wendy is trying to kill him). However, he hints that he and Stella would eventually date in the future.

Critical response 

Donna Bowman of the A.V. Club rated the episode B+. Omar G of Television Without Pity gave the episode a grade B.

References

External links 
 

How I Met Your Mother (season 3) episodes
2007 American television episodes